Myla may refer to:

People
 Myla Dalbesio (born 1987), American model
 Myla Goldberg (born 1971), American novelist
 Myla Pablo (born 1993), Filipino volleyball player
 Myla Rose Federer

Places
 Myla, Russia
 Myla (river), Russia

Other
 MYLA

See also
 Mila (disambiguation)